is a 1956 black-and-white Japanese film directed by Haku Komori

It is a sport film about cycling.

Cast 

Michiko Maeda as Miki Shiino

Junko Ebata as Yoshiko Konishi

Sachiko Tôyama as Keiko Hara

Yôichi Numata as Shinya Kuramoto

Sumiko Abe as Mieko Shibui

Kôtarô Sugiyama as Kenichi Igarashi - Miki's Fiance

Shigeru Ogura as Genzô Igarashi

Noriko Kitazawa as Masae Shiino - Miki's Sister

Fumiko Miyata as Hisako Akiyama

Kikuko Hanaoka as Tomoe Shiino - Miki's Mother

Hiroshi Ayukawa as Eiji Konishi

Ureo Egawa as Mitarai

Keiko Hamano

Yuriko Kinoshita as Chisako Tahara

Sachiko Harada - Bicycle Racer

Kyôko Hinatsu

Kôji Hirose

Yoshiko Katô as Kiku Kôno

Ichiro Kodama as Sugawara

Akemi Nishi

Ritsuko Nonomura as Setsuko Murakoshi

Shinji Suzuki

Chiyoko Tazawa

References 

Cycling films
Japanese black-and-white films
1956 films
Shintoho films
Japanese sports films
Films directed by Haku Komori
1950s Japanese films
1950s sports films